Mangroves National Park (also  or Muanda Marine Reserve) is a protected area and Ramsar wetland in the Democratic Republic of the Congo. It is the country's only marine park and is notable for its mangrove forests. It provides protection to the endangered manatee population situated at the mouth of the Congo River. These mangroves are distinct from the ones found in South Asia. They form a separate type of mangrove forests, which are typical to the Democratic Republic of Congo. The park was established in 1992.

Geography
At  in size, the park is DR Congo's smallest protected area.

Flora and fauna
In addition to the manatee, the area supports hippopotamuses, crocodiles, snakes, and Southern reedbuck. The bushbuck may also be present.

References

External links
 United Nations Environment Programme assessment

National parks of the Democratic Republic of the Congo
Protected areas established in 1992
Ramsar sites in the Democratic Republic of the Congo
Marine parks
1992 establishments in Zaire